Hikaru Masai (born July 2, 1987), who has gone by the stage names Hikaru and currently Helical (stylized H-el-ical//), is a Japanese pop singer. She was one of the core members of the vocal group Kalafina, which was started by Yuki Kajiura to perform anime television and film theme songs. She is from Toyama Prefecture. In 2007, she was selected to join Kalafina in an audition held by Sony Music Japan, and debuted on their second single "Sprinter" in 2008. During her ten years there, Kalafina released five studio albums and two compilation albums, all of which have charted in the Oricon top 10. Her Kalafina profile describes her voice range as the mid-to-high register, a wide range that is "powerful, stylish, and sharp". Following the resignation of music composer Yuki Kajiura from Space Craft, Hikaru would later leave the label on October 20, 2018, after her contract expired.

In November 2019, she launched her solo project under the name H-el-ical//, pronounced "he-ri-ka-ru" (ヘリカル). In April 2020, she released her first single "Altern-ate-" under NBCUniversal Entertainment Japan. It was used as the theme song for the anime television series Gleipnir. and reached No. 9 on the Oricon charts. She has written and released some concept music on her self-titled mini-album and another mini-album called elements, releasing videos on YouTube. In November, she released her second single "disclose", which was the ending theme for the anime television series Magatsu Wahrheit -Zuerst-. In November 2021, she released her third single "The Sacred Torch", which was used as the opening theme for the anime television series The Faraway Paladin. On the same month, she released her fourth indie album Story. In January 2022, she released her fourth single "JUST DO IT", which was used as the opening theme for the anime television series World's End Harem. The single was originally scheduled to release in November 2021, but it was postponed until January 2022.

In April 2022, she announced her first major studio album Kaihouku. Her past four singles were included. The album was released on June 29, 2022.

Discography

Singles

As lead artist

As a collaborating artist

Studio albums

Studio concept albums

Music videos

Concept videos

References

External links 

  
 Hikaru profile at Space Craft 
 H-el-ical// at Oricon 

1987 births
Living people
Japanese women pop singers
Musicians from Toyama Prefecture
Anime singers
21st-century Japanese singers
21st-century Japanese women singers